Rollinia calcarata is a species of plant in the Annonaceae family. It is endemic to Brazil.

References

calcarata
Endemic flora of Brazil
Endangered plants
Endangered biota of South America
Taxonomy articles created by Polbot
Taxobox binomials not recognized by IUCN